Heek is a municipality in the district of Borken, in North Rhine-Westphalia, Germany. It is located near the border with the Netherlands, approx. 20 km south-east of Enschede. Heek consists of two villages, Heek and Nienborg.

Sights 
The municipality has various sights to offer:
 Nienborg Castle
 Saint Ludgerus Church in Heek. In 1256, this catholic church was mentioned in a document for the first time. It was enlarged several times. The church houses various masterpieces of art, e.g. a baroque pulpit dating from 1755 and a medieval tabernacle from 1520.
 In the middle of Heek, Eppingscher Hof, a historic farm house dating from 1857, was transformed into a cultural center in 1990.

References

Borken (district)